Rubén Mendoza Ayala (2 February 1961 – 16 April 2016) was a Mexican politician who was affiliated with the Party of the Democratic Revolution. He served as Deputy of the LVII and LIX Legislatures of the Mexican Congress representing the State of Mexico.

He later was Municipal President of Tlalnepantla from 2000 to 2003. In 2005 he ran against Enrique Peña Nieto to the Governature of the State. In 2009 he was disaffiliated of the National Action Party due to irregular financial managements of the party's accounts. In 2012 he affiliated with the Party of the Democratic Revolution, where he ran again to the Governature.

References

1961 births
2016 deaths
Politicians from the State of Mexico
National Autonomous University of Mexico alumni
Members of the Chamber of Deputies (Mexico) for the State of Mexico
Institutional Revolutionary Party politicians
National Action Party (Mexico) politicians
Party of the Democratic Revolution politicians
People from Tlalnepantla de Baz
20th-century Mexican politicians
21st-century Mexican politicians
Municipal presidents in the State of Mexico
Deputies of the LVII Legislature of Mexico
Deputies of the LIX Legislature of Mexico